Abdelhadi Legdali (born 8 February 1966) is a Moroccan table tennis player. He competed in the men's singles event at the 1992 Summer Olympics.

References

1966 births
Living people
Moroccan male table tennis players
Olympic table tennis players of Morocco
Table tennis players at the 1992 Summer Olympics
Place of birth missing (living people)